Taman Jaya is an elevated rapid transit station in Petaling Jaya, Selangor, Malaysia, forming part of the Kelana Jaya Line (formerly known as PUTRA). The station was opened on September 1, 1998, as part of the line's first segment encompassing 10 elevated stations between Kelana Jaya station and Pasar Seni station (not including the KL Sentral station opened later), and the line's maintenance depot in Lembah Subang.

Location
Taman Jaya station is located directly north of Petaling Jaya's "newer" segment, Section 52, over the side road of Persiaran Barat (West Drive) close to the Persiaran Barat-Lorong Sultan (Sultan Alley) intersection, off the main thoroughfare of Jalan Timur (East Road). Due to its proximity to Section 52, the Taman Jaya station is situated close to several municipal buildings and Dataran Petaling Jaya (Petaling Jaya Square), a municipal field. In addition to Section 52, Taman Jaya station is within walking distance of neighbouring Sections 9, 10 and 11 to the east. The station takes its name from Taman Jaya (Jaya Park) in Section 10, a lake gardens and the first park founded in Petaling Jaya. Also in the vicinity of the station is the Amcorp Mall & Business Centre, the PJ Club adjoining Dataran Petaling Jaya, Syabas Club and the iconic A&W drive-in outlet.

The station is also situated some 440 metres from the nearest access point into the Federal Highway via Jalan Timur to the north. The neighbouring Asia Jaya station is roughly located in the same location 900 metres away to the west, although Asia Jaya station was constructed on the opposing north side of the Federal Highway, is further from Section 52, but has better access to bus services.

Around the station
 Taman Jaya
 Amcorp Mall
 Headquarters of Malaysian Meteorological Department
 Headquarters of Department of Chemistry, Malaysia
 Petaling Jaya Courthouse
 Petaling Jaya City Council Headquarters
 Petaling Jaya Museum
 Petaling Jaya Square
 Catholic High School

See also

 List of rail transit stations in Klang Valley

References

Kelana Jaya Line
Railway stations opened in 1900